Norro may refer to:

In Sweden 
 Norrö, Österåkers Municipality, in Österåker Municipality

People 
 Norro Wilson (1938–2017), stage name for Norris Denton Wilson, American country music singer-songwriter

See also 
 Noro (disambiguation)